Hypatima scotia is a moth in the family Gelechiidae. It was described by Turner in 1919. It is found in Australia, where it has been recorded from Queensland.

The wingspan is about 12 mm. The forewings are ochreous-whitish, uniformly suffused with fuscous and with several tufts of raised scales on or near the costa, one especially large at one-third. The hindwings are grey.

References

Hypatima
Moths described in 1919